Wild- and Rhinegrave Charles of Salm-Dhaun (21 September 1675 – 26 March 1733) was Wild- and Rhinegrave of Salm-Dhaun from 1693 to 1733.  He was born in Hochstetten-Dhaun, the son of Wild- and Rhinegrave John Philip II of Salm-Dhaun and his wife, Anna Catherine of Nassau-Ottweiler.

He married on 19 January 1704 in Ottweiler to his first cousin Louise, the daughter of Count Frederick Louis of Nassau-Ottweiler.  Charles and Louise had ten children:
 Catherine Louise (b. 1705)
 Caroline (b. 1706)
 Christina (b. 1710)
 Wilhelmina (b. 1712)
 Albertine (b. 1716)
 Charles Augustus (b. 1718)
 Sophie Charlotte (b. 1719)
 Louise (b. 1721)
 John Philip III (b. 1724)
 Jeanette Louise (b. 1725)

Charles died in Hochstetten-Dhaun, aged 57.

Salm family
Counts of Salm
1675 births
1733 deaths
17th-century German people
18th-century German people